Edward Lee Reed (October 12, 1929 – January 25, 2009) was an American Negro league outfielder for the Memphis Red Sox in the 1950s.

A native of Straven, Alabama, Reed served in the US Army prior to his professional baseball career. Reed was selected to represent Memphis in the 1953 East–West All-Star Game. He continued to play minor league baseball through 1962. Reed died in Great Falls, Montana in 2009 at age 79.

References

External links
 Eddie Reed at Negro Leagues Baseball Museum

1929 births
2009 deaths
Memphis Red Sox players
Baseball outfielders
Baseball players from Alabama
People from Shelby County, Alabama
20th-century African-American sportspeople
21st-century African-American people